Emily Miller may refer to:

 Emily Huntington Miller (1833–1913), author, poet, educator
 Emily J. Miller, Conservative political pundit.
 Emily Miller (police officer) (1871–1962), Scottish nurse and police officer